The Kim Il-sung Prize(김일성상) is an award given by the Government of North Korea to persons in various fields who demonstrate exemplary service to the values of Juche idea. Past winners include the Korean composer Kim Won-gyun, judoka Kye Sun-hui, and the Arirang Festival.

Recipients
Ri Chun-hee (2012, news presenter)
CNC instrument automatic streamline (2011)
Among the People (book series, 2017)
Arirang Festival
Glorifying the Era of Juche (book series)
Jong Kwan-chol (painter)
Kim Won-gyun (composer, 1972)
Ku Hui-chol (poet)
Kye Sun-hui (judoka, 2003)
 (actor and director)
Pak Jong-ju (film director)
Ri Hui-chan (scriptwriter)
Rim Kum-dan (children's writer)
Ro Ik-hwa (sculptor)
Jong Yong-man (painter)
O Tae-hyong (sculptor)
U Chi-son (potter,1989) 
Kim Sok-hyong (academician)
Kim Jong-il (leader of North Korea, February 1973 and March 2012)
Kim Si Kwon (poet, 1988)
Kim Pyong-hwa (writer of Arirang)
Kim Chun-hui (weightlifting coach) 
People's Actress Kim Jong Hwa (actor) 
People's Actor Kim Ryong Rim (actor) 
Ri Hui Chan (film author) 
O Hye Yong (film author) 
Labour Hero People's Artist Pak Jong Ju (film director) 
Choe Il Sim (film author) 
Jang Yu Son (film author) 
Yui Ung Yong (film author) 
People's Artist Jon Jong Sok (cameraman) 
Pak Ho Il (film author)

See also

International Kim Il-sung Prize
Orders and medals of North Korea
People's Prize

References

Kim Il-sung
Orders, decorations, and medals of North Korea